The Department of Aboriginal Affairs (Western Australia) is the former government authority that was involved with the matters of the Aboriginal population of Western Australia.

Aborigines Protection Board
Prior to the creation of the Aborigines Department in 1898, there had been an Aborigines Protection Board, which operated between 1 January 1886 and 1 April 1898 as a Statutory authority. It was created by the Aborigines Protection Act 1886 (WA), also known as the Half-caste act,  An Act to provide for the better protection and management of the Aboriginal natives of Western Australia, and to amend the law relating to certain contracts with such Aboriginal natives (statute 25/1886); An Act to provide certain matters connected with the Aborigines (statute 24/1889).

The Board was replaced in 1898 by the Aborigines Department.

Current status
The department took its current name in May 2013.

On 28 April 2017 Premier Mark McGowan announced that Western Australia's 41 departments would be reduced to 25 departments by 1 July 2017. The departments of Planning, Lands, Heritage and the Aboriginal heritage and land functions of the Department of Aboriginal Affairs amalgamated on 1 July 2017, forming the Department of Planning, Lands and Heritage. The Department of the Premier and Cabinet assumed responsibility for Aboriginal Affairs policy.

Agencies
 Aborigines Department  	               - 1 Apr 1898 ~ 31 Dec 1908
 Department of Aborigines and Fisheries       - 1 Jan 1909 ~ 1 Jan 1920
 Aborigines Department  	               - 1 January 1926 – 1 January 1936
 Department of the North West 	               - 1 January 1920 – 1 January 1926 	  
 Fisheries Department  	               - 1 January 1920 – 1 September 1964 	 
 Department of Native Affairs 	               - 1 January 1936 - 31 December 1954	  
 Department of Native Welfare 	               - 1 January 1955 - 16 June 1972	  
 Aboriginal Affairs Planning Authority        - 16 June 1972 - 31 October 1994 	  
 Aboriginal Affairs Department 	       - 1 November 1994 - 30 June 2001 	  
 Department of Indigenous Affairs 	       - 1 July 2001 - 16 May 2013
 Department of Aboriginal Affairs             - 2013 - 2017
 Department of Planning, Lands and Heritage (DPLH) 2017-

See also
 Protector of Aborigines

Notes

External links

 
Aboriginal
Indigenous Australians in Western Australia